Tonina may refer to:

Toniná, Mexican archaeological site and ruined city
Tonina (name)

Other
Tonina fluviatilis, the sole species in the plant genus Tonina and a member of the family Eriocaulaceae
Las Toninas town in Argentina

See also

Tonia (disambiguation)
Tonin (disambiguation)
Tonino (disambiguation)
Tonita (name)
Tonna (disambiguation)
Toninia, genus of fungiŎ